The following lists events that happened during 1966 in the Central African Republic.

Incumbents
President: David Dacko (until January 1), Jean-Bédel Bokassa (starting January 1)

Events

January
 January 1 - A coup brings Colonel Jean-Bédel Bokassa into power in the Central African Republic, ousting President David Dacko.

References

 
Years of the 20th century in the Central African Republic
1960s in the Central African Republic
Central African Republic
Central African Republic